"Ratamahatta" is a song by Brazilian metal band Sepultura. It was the third and final single from the band's 1996 album Roots. It is also the last Sepultura single to feature founding frontman Max Cavalera. The song is amongst the band's best-known and remains a concert staple to this day. A music video was created for the song using stop-motion animation which explores the themes of the song. This video can be found on the VHS Sepultura: We Are What We Are, which was later released on DVD as part of Chaos DVD.

The song features guest appearances from Carlinhos Brown on vocals and then Korn drummer David Silveria on percussion. It is amongst Sepultura's most percussive and tribal songs.

The song also appears in live form on the band's live release Under a Pale Grey Sky.

Artwork
The artwork is a painting which reflects the video. Featured primarily on the sleeve is Zé do Caixão.

Releases
The single was released on 2 CDs and 7" vinyl. The first CD was presented in a card foldout digipak case, while the second was in a standard slimline jewel case. Early copies of the digipak version were embossed with a stamp of the band's thorned ‘S' logo. The vinyl was a strictly limited edition.

Track listing
CD1 (Digipak)
"Ratamahatta" (edit)
"War" (Bob Marley cover)
"Slave New World" (live)
"Amen/Inner Self" (live)

CD2
"Ratamahatta" (edit)
"War" (Bob Marley cover)
"Dusted" (demo version)
"Roots Bloody Roots" (demo version)

7" vinyl
"Ratamahatta"
"Mass Hypnosis" (live) (from Under Siege (Live in Barcelona))

Note that all of these B-sides except for "Mass Hypnosis" (live) and "Amen/Inner Self" (live) would be collected on Blood-Rooted.
"Slave New World" (live) and "Amen/Inner Self" (live) were recorded live in Minneapolis, Minnesota in March 1994.

Cover versions
 Soulfly covers the song live. A recording of this can be found on the DVD, The Song Remains Insane.

In popular culture
Brazilian fighter Thiago Silva used this as his entrance song at UFC 102, UFC 108 and UFC 125.

Personnel
Max Cavalera – lead vocals, rhythm guitar
Andreas Kisser – lead guitar
Paulo Jr. – bass
Igor Cavalera – drums
Additional personnel
Carlinhos Brown – backing vocals
David Silveria – percussion
Produced by Ross Robinson and Sepultura
Recorded and engineered by Ross Robinson
Mixed by Andy Wallace
Assistant engineer: Richard Kaplan

References

Sepultura songs
1996 singles
Songs written by Max Cavalera
Songs written by Igor Cavalera
Songs written by Andreas Kisser
Songs written by Paulo Jr.
Nu metal songs
1996 songs
Roadrunner Records singles